Ctenopseustis herana, the brownheaded leafroller,  is a moth of the family Tortricidae. It is native to New Zealand, where it is found on the South, Stewart and Chatham islands. The common name is also used for related species Ctenopseustis obliquana and Ctenopseustis fraterna.

The wingspan is 20–28 mm. Adults are extremely variable in colour and forewing pattern. In both sexes the forewings are often walnut brown, but vary from dark brown (almost black) to a pale fawn, and have a variety of colour combinations.

The larvae feed on a wide range of plants, including avocado to which they can cause significant damage to young fruitlets and terminal shoots.

References

Archipini
Moths of New Zealand
Taxa named by Alois Friedrich Rogenhofer